Desiderata (fl. 771), was a queen consort of the Franks, who was one of four daughters of Desiderius, King of the Lombards, and his wife, Ansa, Queen of the Lombards. She was married to Charlemagne in 770 for him to create a bond between Francia and the Kingdom of the Lombards and to attempt to isolate his brother Carloman I, who ruled over the central territories of Francia. The marriage lasted just one year, and there are no known children from the marriage.

Marriage to Charlemagne 
Desiderata was the first (potentially second) wife of Charlemagne, although there are some questions over the nature of Charlemagne's relationship to Himiltrude, his potentially first wife. Carolingian historian Janet Nelson states that the marriage and resulting alliance with the Lombards was directed against Carloman, leaving Charlemagne's brother encircled as a result. The marriage received opposition from Pope Stephen III, who in the summer of 770 wrote a letter to Charlemagne and Carloman voicing his discontent at the potential union between "the most notable race of the Franks and that fetid brood of the Lombard's that had brought leprosy into the land." There is no mention of this marriage in the Royal Frankish Annals nor the revised version, however, it is mentioned briefly in chapter 18 of Einhard's Life of Charlemagne biography when he states that "at the urging of his mother he married a daughter of Desiderius."

Debate surrounding her name 
Although she is commonly referred to by the name Desiderata there is some debate surrounding her name. One school of thought is that the name derives from an editorial error in a 19th-century copy of the Monumenta Germaniae Historica which capitalized the 'D' in desideratam filiam (Latin for 'desired daughter'). Janet Nelson argues that it is far more likely that Desiderata's name is actually 'Gerperga.' Nelson provides multiple reasons as to why this is the case, firstly, the name fits in with the names of Desiderius' other daughters, all of which end in the suffix 'perga.' Secondly, Carloman's wife was called Gerberga, and this, Nelson believes, explains why when Gerberga fled to Desiderius after Carloman's death, the Annals of Lobbes believed that she was fleeing to her father, due to confusion over the similarities of their names. Additionally, in Pope Stephen III's letter to Charlemagne and Carloman, he is not sure of which brother is marrying Gerperga, Nelson argues that this confusion is also caused by the similarity in the names of Desiderius' Daughter and Carloman's wife.

References 

8th-century births
Wives of Charlemagne
Repudiated queens
Lombard women
Year of death missing
Carolingian dynasty
8th-century Lombard people